This is a list of titles, including ranks and other official positions of authority, that have only ever been held by one person.

List

References

Titles held only by one person
Titles